Little Burstead is a village in Essex, England. It lies 2¼ miles SSW of Billericay, and 4½ E by S of Brentwood railway station.

In 1086 the parish had 9 households and was held by the Bishop of London. Before the Norman conquest it was held by Godwin of Benfield. In the 19th century the parish had an area of 1,829 acres and a population in 1870 of 186 (37 houses).

The ancient parish of Little Burstead was located in Barstable Hundred and was joined to Billericay Rural District when that was established in 1894. The civil parish was abolished in 1937 when it was merged with several other parishes into Billericay Urban District 

Little Burstead Parish was re-established in 1997 and the parish council has five elected / co-opted members. Electorate at 1 June 2011 of 327, The Parish Council regularly meets bi-monthly at Little Burstead Village Hall. It forms part of Basildon district. the population increasing to 395 at the 2011 census.

The parish church is the church of St. Mary the Virgin, set in a picturesque but isolated rural situation on high ground overlooking the Thames valley. It was built in late Norman times as a windowed oratory and was originally much smaller. The roof of the nave would have been much lower, and the door was on the north side opposite the present south door, which is 15th century. The altar was almost certainly sited in the recess to the side of the present pulpit. Extensive alterations would have occurred when the chancel was added in the mid-14th century. The walls of the church are built of ragstone rubble and of puddingstone (a conglomerate of pebbles in a siliceous matrix found locally) with limestone and brick dressing. The round stones on either side of the porch are probably the base of a churchyard calvary. The south door is 15th century, and the porch was added much later. The font is early 16th century. The gallery was added in 1880.

A probable explanation for the present isolated position of the church might be explained by looking further back in history than the modern site of the village and considering that the back of the church was in fact 'the front'. The road that now leads to the church probably did not exist at the time it was built and the main route from Billericay ran from Tye Common, through Wiggins Lane, across to Hatches Farm road and up Botney Hill towards Herongate. Three manors were sited between Botney Hill and the Dunton road and standing in this area one can see that the church is positioned so that it overlooks the area that it probably served.

Laindon Common is in Little Burstead. The Common is managed by the Laindon Common Conservators on behalf of Basildon Council.

References

External links
 Basildon Heritage
 Basildon Borough History - Burstead

Villages in Essex
Civil parishes in Essex
Borough of Basildon